Professor Hannibal (Hungarian: Hannibál tanár úr) is a 1956 Hungarian drama film directed by Zoltán Fábri and starring Ernő Szabó, Zoltán Greguss and Manyi Kiss. The film is based on a novel by Ferenc Móra set in Budapest during the Interwar period. When a Latin teacher publishes an essay on the Carthaginian General Hannibal, he is quickly hailed as a celebrity genius, but in reality has become an unwitting pawn of far-right politicians. The film was chosen to be part both of Budapest Twelve, a list of Hungarian films considered the best in 1968 and its follow-up, the New Budapest Twelve in 2000.

Release
The initial popularity of the film is hard to judge as five days after it premiered on 18 October 1956 the Hungarian Uprising began. It was re-released in 1957.

Partial cast
 Ernő Szabó - Nyúl Béla 
 Zoltán Greguss - Muray 
 Manyi Kiss - Nyúl Béláné
 Noémi Apor - Lola 
 Emmi Buttykay - Mici 
 Hilda Gobbi - Vogelmayerné 
 Oszkár Ascher - Schwarz Béni 
 Ödön Bárdi - Danielisz 
 Béla Barsi - Menyus 
 Ferenc Bessenyei - Hannibál 
 György Kálmán - Újságíró
 Zoltán Makláry - Manzák 
 László Mensáros - Török 
 László Misoga - Vogelmayer 
 Lajos Rajczy - Rezsõ úr 
 Mihály Selmeczy - Ofenthaler igazgató
 Rudolf Somogyvári - Vidrozsil 
 József Szendrõ - Wilhelm

References

Bibliography
 Cunningham, John. Hungarian Cinema: From Coffee House to Multiplex. Wallflower Press, 2004.

External links

1956 films
Hungarian drama films
1950s Hungarian-language films
Hungarian satirical films
Films based on Hungarian novels
Films set in Budapest
Films set in the 1930s
Hungarian black-and-white films
Hungarian political satire films
Films directed by Zoltán Fábri
1956 drama films